Clyde Abrahams (born 15 October 1978) is a South African field hockey player who competed in the 2008 Summer Olympics.

References

External links

1978 births
Living people
South African male field hockey players
Olympic field hockey players of South Africa
2002 Men's Hockey World Cup players
2006 Men's Hockey World Cup players
Field hockey players at the 2008 Summer Olympics
Field hockey players at the 2002 Commonwealth Games
Field hockey players at the 2006 Commonwealth Games
Commonwealth Games competitors for South Africa
21st-century South African people